Trấn Thành (born February 5, 1987), full name Huỳnh Trấn Thành, is a Vietnamese comedian, actor, and a major presenter in Vietnamese television.

Biography
Trấn Thành was born and raised in Ho Chi Minh City. His father is of Chinese descent from Guangdong and his mother from Tien Giang. Besides Vietnamese, he can communicate fluently in English, Cantonese, and Mandarin.

In terms of education, artist Trấn Thành used to be trained to pursue his career as an actor when he decided to study actor science at the School of Theater and Cinema in Ho Chi Minh City. He won the 3rd prize in the 2006 TV show competition. He successfully demonstrated the versatility and sense of humor in leading the program such as: Say It Out (a program for foreigners to learn the Vietnamese language), Cau Vong Nghe Thuat, So You Think You Can Dance, Gala cười 2011, or Vietnamese version of Are You Smarter than a 5th Grader?.

He is able to mimic many voices; such as Lam Trường, Duy Mạnh, Thanh Lam, Hồng Ngọc, Việt Anh, Thành Lộc, Việt Hương, Minh Nhí, Trung Dân and Lệ Thủy. Generally, the mimicking ability enabled him to easily works for a voice role in many Vietnamese-adapted animation movies such as Alvin and the Chipmunks: Chipwrecked, Madagascar 3: Europe's Most Wanted, Despicable Me 2 and Turbo.

In January 2016, he joined Vietnam's Got Talent as a judge for its fourth season. Later, in May 2016, he was fined 32.5 million VND for playing a role in the comedy play "To Anh Nguyet Remix" (generated from Tô Ánh Nguyệt by Trần Hữu Trang) in Paris by Night 116 show.

Career
He became a popular television host in many games shows on TV, such as Ơn giời cậu đây rồi!, Đấu trường tiếu lâm, Ai cũng bật cười, Người bí ẩn, & Nhanh như chớp.

TV presenter 
With the ability to speak with a sharp and deep mind, artist Trấn Thành has brought to the audience different levels of emotions and he has been a well-renowned and successful in guiding programs.

Programs with MC Trấn Thành are considered to have been funny, humorous, and full of human philosophy. Here are a few programs in Trấn Thành's career as an MC that has successfully completed his role on stage: Teen Jump, Vietnamese Comedy King, Perfect Couple 2013, Challenge with Dancing - So You Think You Can Dance, Just say it - Say it if you dare, Gala Laugh 2011, Watch me act - Let us show, etc.

From 2019-present, Thanh has appeared in Sieu Tri Tue Vietnam as the host of the show in the final episode of Season 1 he said “The brainy youth will face their predecessors.” He is still the host as of season 2.

Comedy 
During Trấn Thành's early years in showbiz, he was known mostly through his comedy. Over time, Trấn Thành's career has grown to include becoming a presenter as well as an actor.

Personal life
Tran Thanh can speak English, Vietnamese, Cantonese and Mandarin. He married Vietnamese-Korean singer and actress Hari Won on December 25, 2016 in Ho Chi Minh City.

References

External Links 
 Speaking Mandarin, English, Vietnamese: Trấn Thành bắn tiếng Hoa
 Speaking Cantonese: Trấn Thành trổ tài MC nói tiếng Hoa

1987 births
Living people
Vietnamese male film actors
Vietnamese male television actors
Vietnamese male voice actors
People from Ho Chi Minh City
Vietnamese people of Chinese descent